Carl John Barrameda (born October 12, 1993) is a Filipino actor turned director working for ABS-CBN.

Filmography

Television

Film

References

External links
Carl John Barrameda at Telebisyon.net

1993 births
Star Magic
Living people
Filipino male film actors
ABS-CBN personalities
Filipino male television actors